Natalya Mikhaylovna Nepryayeva (born 6 September 1995) is a Russian cross-country skier. She participated in the 2018 Winter Olympics as part of the Olympic Athletes from Russia team and 2022 Winter Olympics as part of the Russian Olympic Committee team, winning a total of four medals, including a gold in the 4 × 5 km relay.

Career
Nepryayeva was first included to the Russian national team in 2015. Her breakthrough came in 2018 when she won bronze as part of the Russian relay team. 

In the 2018–19 season, Nepryayeva became the first Russian female skier to finish in the top 3 of the Tour de Ski. At the 2019 FIS Nordic World Ski Championships, Nepryayeva became the first female Russian skier since 2007 to medal in skiathlon (then known as double pursuit). Overall, she won three medals at the World Championships in 2019 and 2021.

Nepryayeva became the first Russian female skier to win the Tour de Ski, doing so during the 2021–22 World Cup season. Furthermore, she won the World Cup, despite being excluded from the last two stages due to sanctions related to the Russian invasion of Ukraine. She became the first Russian female skier to do so since Yuliya Chepalova in the 2000–01 season.

Cross-country skiing results
All results are sourced from the International Ski Federation (FIS).

Olympic Games
4 medals – (1 gold, 1 silver, 2 bronze)

World Championships
3 medals – (1 silver, 2 bronze)

World Cup

Season titles
 2 titles – (1 Overall, 1 U23)

Season standings

Individual podiums
6 victories – (2 , 4 ) 
25 podiums – (16 , 9 )

Team podiums
 1 victory – (1 ) 
 2 podiums – (1 , 1 )

Honours
She was awarded the Medal of the Order "For Merit to the Fatherland" after the 2018 Olympics.

Notes

References

External links

1995 births
Living people
Sportspeople from Tver
Cross-country skiers at the 2018 Winter Olympics
Cross-country skiers at the 2022 Winter Olympics
Russian female cross-country skiers
Tour de Ski skiers
Olympic cross-country skiers of Russia
Medalists at the 2018 Winter Olympics
Medalists at the 2022 Winter Olympics
Olympic gold medalists for the Russian Olympic Committee athletes
Olympic silver medalists for the Russian Olympic Committee athletes
Olympic bronze medalists for Olympic Athletes from Russia
Olympic bronze medalists for the Russian Olympic Committee athletes
Olympic medalists in cross-country skiing
FIS Nordic World Ski Championships medalists in cross-country skiing